Luedemannella is a Gram-positive, aerobic and non-motile genus of bacteria from the family Micromonosporaceae. Luedemannella is named after the  Russian actinomycetologist George M. Luedemann.

References

Further reading 
 

Micromonosporaceae
Bacteria genera